Mihajlo Čeprkalo (born 9 June 1999) is a Bosnian swimmer. He competed in the men's 1500 metre freestyle event at the 2016 Summer Olympics.

References

External links
 

1999 births
Living people
Sportspeople from Banja Luka
Bosnia and Herzegovina male freestyle swimmers
Olympic swimmers of Bosnia and Herzegovina
Swimmers at the 2016 Summer Olympics
Serbs of Bosnia and Herzegovina